Berthold I (c. 1060 – 18 May 1090), better known as Berthold of Rheinfelden, was the Duke of Swabia from 1079 until his death. He was the eldest son of Rudolf of Rheinfelden, duke of Swabia, and German anti-king (r.1077–1079) in opposition to Henry IV  of Germany. 

The identity of Berthold's mother is disputed. She is sometimes said to be Rudolf's first wife, Matilda of Germany (sister of Henry IV), and sometimes said to be Rudolf's second wife, Adelaide of Savoy (if this were the case, then Berthold must have been born after c.1062), and sometimes said to be Rudolf's son by another, unknown, wife.

After the death of Rudolf's second wife Adelaide in 1079, Rudolf needed a new supervisor of the south German resistance, since he was himself confined to Saxony and cut off from his allies in Swabia. Rudolf therefore made his son, Berthold, Duke of Swabia. Henry, however, appointed Frederick of Stauf, who had lands strategically located much to his advantage. 

Throughout the civil war against Henry IV, Swabia was thrown into chaos. In 1084, Berthold was besieged by supporters of Henry IV. Although he had a larger power base, he was of lower rank. He eventually left the fight to his brother-in-law, Berthold II, Duke of Swabia, and Welf IV. When Berthold died without descendants in 1090 and was buried in the monastery of Saint Blaise, Berthold II, who was married to his sister, Agnes of Rheinfelden succeeded him as duke of Swabia.

Notes

References
 
G. Wunder, 'Beiträge zur Genealogie schwäbischer Herzogshäuser,' Zeitschrift für Württembergische Landesgeschichte 31 (1972), pp. 11-15
A. Zettler, Geschichte des Herzogtums Schwaben (Stuttgart, 2003)
A. Thiele, Genealogische Stammtafeln zur europäischen Geschichte Band I, Teilband 1 (Frankfurt am Main, 1993). 
K. Schmid, ed., Die Zähringer (Sigmaringen, 1990)
H. Frommer, Die Salier und das Herzogtum Schwaben (Karlsruhe, 1992) 
E. Boshof, Die Salier (Stuttgart, 1987). 

1090 deaths
Dukes of Swabia
Year of birth uncertain
Sons of kings